The 2006–07 season was Feyenoord's 51st consecutive season playing in the Eredivisie, the top division of Dutch football.
Feyenoord finished 7th in the 2006–07 Eredivisie and did not qualify for the 2007–08 UEFA Cup. In the 2006–07 KNVB Cup they lost in the 3rd round to RKC Waalwijk. But the absolute worst date in the season was 19 January 2007. On this date the UEFA decided to resign Feyenoord from the 2006–07 UEFA Cup after the supporters misbehaved in the game in and versus Nancy. The game versus Tottenham Hotspur F.C. did not continue. On 3 may head coach Erwin Koeman handed in his resignation due to motivational problems after a troublesome season.

Competitions

Overall

Eredivisie

League table

Results summary

Matches

Eredivisie Play-offs UEFA Cup

KNVB Cup

UEFA Cup

Friendlies

Player details

Transfers

In:

Out:

Club

Coaching staff

Kit

|
|
|

References

Feyenoord seasons
Dutch football clubs 2006–07 season